13th Central Committee may refer to:
Central Committee of the 13th Congress of the All-Union Communist Party (Bolsheviks), 1924–1925
13th Central Committee of the Bulgarian Communist Party, 1986–1990
13th Central Committee of the Chinese Communist Party, 1987–1992
13th Central Committee of the Romanian Communist Party, 1984–1989
13th Central Committee of the Communist Party of Vietnam, 2021–2026
13th Central Committee of the League of Communists of Yugoslavia, 1986–1990